Jethro Ayers Hatch (June 18, 1837 – August 3, 1912) was an American physician and politician who served one term as a U.S. Representative from Indiana from 1895 to 1897.

Biography

Early life and ancestors
He was born on June 18, 1837 in Pitcher, New York the son of Jethro Hatch, Sr. and Minerva Pierce, the daughter of Gordon Pierce and Thirza Smalley.  He was the grandson of Timothy Hatch, one of the Proprietors and Pioneers of Sherburne, New York.  Timothy's wife was Ruth Welles, the sister of Martha Welles, wife of the Rev. Blackleach Burritt, and a direct descendant of Gov.Thomas Welles, the Fourth Colonial Governor of Connecticut and the transcriber of the Fundamental Orders into the official colony records of Connecticut. He was also a cousin of Herschel H. Hatch, a politician and attorney from Michigan.

Hatch settled in Sugar Grove, Illinois in 1847 with his parents and four siblings, being pioneers of Kane County, Illinois.

Marriage and family
He married on May 26, 1881, in Kentland, Indiana, Sarah Melissa Shaeffer, the  daughter of Gilbert and Margaret Shaeffer of Lancaster, Ohio.  They were the parents of two children:

Darwin Shaeffer Hatch, a graduate of Purdue University, and a writer and Editor in Chief of Motor Age Magazine, later purchased by the Walt Disney Company

Hazel Margaret Hatch, a 1902 graduate of Ferry Hall School, Lake Forest, Illinois and a 1906 graduate of Indiana University. She married Claude Seymore Steele a graduate of Northwestern University, Evanston, Illinois. He served as a Senator in the Indiana Senate, the upper house of the Indiana General Assembly.

Education and career
He attended the common schools and graduated from Batavia Institute in Batavia, Illinois. He was graduated from Rush Medical College, Chicago, Illinois, in February 1860 and commenced practice at Kentland, Indiana, in July 1860.   He was the first physician to locate in Kentland, Indiana in 1861 and practiced until 1862, when he was commissioned Assistant Surgeon of the 36th Illinois Volunteer Infantry Regiment, afterward promoted to be Surgeon, and continued until the close of the war, and was mustered out on October 8, 1865.

He served as a local health officer. He also served as secretary and later president of the pension examining board 1865-1907. He served as member of board of the hospital for the insane at Logansport, Indiana. He also served as a physician and surgeon for the Logansport division of the Pennsylvania Railroad for many years as well as for the Chicago and Cairo division of the New York Central Railroad from the time it was built until 1907.

Politics

Indiana State politics
He served as member of the Indiana House of Representatives from 1872 to 1873.

National politics
Hatch was elected as a Republican to the Fifty-fourth Congress (March 4, 1895 – March 3, 1897), serving Indiana's 10th congressional district.
He was not a candidate for renomination in 1896.
He returned to Kentland, Indiana, and resumed the practice of medicine.

Death
He moved to Victoria, Texas, in 1907 and engaged in the real estate business.
He died in Victoria, Texas on August 3, 1912 and was interred in Fair Lawn Cemetery, Kentland, Indiana.

Notes

References
Crane, Ellery Bicknell. Historic Homes and Institutions and Genealogical and Personal Memoirs of Worcester County, Massachusetts: With a History of Worcester Society of Antiquity. The Lewis Publishing Company, 1907.
Lake City Publishing Company. Portrait and biographical record of Kankakee County, Illinois: Containing biographical sketches of prominent and representative citizens, together with biographies of all the governors of the state, and the presidents of the United States. Lake City Publishing Company, 1898
Lewis Publishing Company. Biographical History of Tippecanoe, White, Jasper, Newton, Benton, Warren and Pulaski Counties, Indiana. The Lewis Publishing Company, 1899
Raymond, M D. Souvenir of the Sherburne Centennial Celebration and Dedication of Monument to the Proprietors and Early Settlers, held on Wednesday, June 21, 1893. New York: M.D. Raymond, 1892.
Raymond, Marcius D. Sketch of Rev. Blackleach Burritt and related Stratford families : a paper read before the Fairfield County Historical Society, at Bridgeport, Conn., Friday evening, February 19, 1892. Bridgeport : Fairfield County Historical Society 1892.

External links
Hatch Family Association, Inc.
 Retrieved on 2009-05-12

1837 births
1912 deaths
People of Indiana in the American Civil War
Rush Medical College alumni
Union Army surgeons
People from Chenango County, New York
People from Kentland, Indiana
People from Victoria, Texas
People from Sugar Grove, Illinois
19th-century American politicians
Military personnel from Texas
Military personnel from Illinois
Republican Party members of the United States House of Representatives from Indiana